"Thought I'd Died and Gone to Heaven" is a song by Canadian singer and songwriter Bryan Adams from his sixth studio album, Waking up the Neighbours (1991). Penned by Robert Lange and Bryan Adams, the song became Adams' third chart-topper in his native Canada, reached  13 on the US Billboard Hot 100, and peaked at No. 8 in the United Kingdom.

Critical reception
Larry Flick, Billboard's reviewer, left warm review on this track and found that "anthemic chorus sounds like it was penned to be chanted in arenas".

Music video

The video is shot in a barley field in the middle of the night with dolphins flying over Bryan Adams and his band.

Track listings
Canadian and US cassette single, Japanese mini-CD single
 "Thought I'd Died and Gone to Heaven"
 "Summer of '69" (live)

UK 7-inch and cassette single
 "Thought I'd Died and Gone to Heaven"
 "Somebody" (live)

UK 12-inch single
A1. "Thought I'd Died and Gone to Heaven"
A2. "Somebody" (live)
B1. "(Everything I Do) I Do It for You" (single version)

UK and Australian CD single, Australian cassette single
 "Thought I'd Died and Gone to Heaven"
 "Somebody" (live)
 "Heat of the Night" (live)

Charts

Weekly charts

Year-end charts

References

1991 songs
1992 singles
Bryan Adams songs
RPM Top Singles number-one singles
Song recordings produced by Robert John "Mutt" Lange
Songs written by Bryan Adams
Songs written by Robert John "Mutt" Lange